Erdal may refer to:

Given name
 Erdal Akdarı, Turkish footballer
 Erdal Arıkan, Turkish professor in Electrical and Electronics Engineering Department at Bilkent University
 Erdal Beşikçioğlu, Turkish actor
 Erdal Bibo, Turkish professional basketball player
 Erdal Çelik, Turkish-German footballer
 Erdal Ceylanoğlu, retired Turkish general
 Erdal Erzincan, Turkish folk music musician, composer, and singer
 Erdal Gezik, contemporary writer on Alevis and honor crimes in Turkey
 Erdal İnönü, Turkish theoretical physicist and politician
 Erdal Karamercan, the Chief Executive Officer and President of Eczacıbaşı Holding
 Erdal Keser, Turkish footballer
 Erdal Kılıçaslan, Turkish-German footballer
 Erdal Kızılçay, multi-instrumental (bass guitar, oud) musician of Turkish birth
 Erdal Merdan, German dramatist, actor, and stage director of Turkish origin
 Erdal Özyağcılar, Turkish actor
 Erdal Pekdemir, Turkish footballer who plays for Orduspor
 Erdal Rakip, Swedish footballer
 Erdal Saygın, Turkish educator and university administrator
 Erdal Sunar, Turkish weightlifter

Surname
 Bahoz Erdal, Kurdish member and commander of the Kurdistan Workers' Party
 Eldrid Erdal, Norwegian politician for the Liberal Party
 Fehriye Erdal, female political activist from Turkey
 Jennie Erdal, Scottish writer
 Jorun Erdal, Norwegian singer and musical theatre artist
 Leiv Erdal, Norwegian military officer, bailiff, and politician for the Centre Party
 Marcel Erdal, linguist and Turkologist, professor and head of the Turkology department at Goethe University
 Paul Erdal, Norwegian boxer who competed in the 1920 Summer Olympics
 Yasin Erdal, Turkish-Dutch futsal player
 Ziya Erdal, Turkish professional footballer

Other uses
 Erdal, Vestland, a village in Askøy municipality in Vestland county, Norway
 Erdal IL, a sports club in Askøy, Norway
 , a brand of shoe polish sold by Werner & Mertz

Turkish-language surnames
Turkish masculine given names